William Edward Seamon (October 19, 1917 – April 25, 1992) was an American bridge player.

Seamon was born in Newark, New Jersey. He lived for years in Miami Beach, Florida, and died there on April 25, 1992, some time after a stroke.

One of his sons, Michael Seamon and his daughter Janice Seamon-Molson are also Bridge players.

Bridge accomplishments

Wins

 North American Bridge Championships (5)
 Grand National Teams (1) 1973 
 Vanderbilt (1) 1963 
 Chicago Mixed Board-a-Match (1) 1974 
 Spingold (2) 1956, 1963

Runners-up

 Bermuda Bowl (1) 1957
 North American Bridge Championships
 Grand National Teams (2) 1978, 1980 
 Vanderbilt (1) 1960 
 Mitchell Board-a-Match Teams (2) 1952, 1973 
 Reisinger (1) 1954

References

External links

 

1992 deaths
1917 births
American contract bridge players
Bermuda Bowl players
People from Miami Beach, Florida
People from Newark, New Jersey